Andrei Eduardovich Chesnokov (born 2 February 1966) is a former professional tennis player from Russia.

Career
Chesnokov's highest singles ranking was World No. 9 in 1991.  The biggest tournament victories of his career came at the Monte Carlo Open in 1990, and at the Canadian Open in 1991 (both Tennis Masters Series events).

Chesnokov's best performance at a Grand Slam event came at the French Open in 1989, where he reached the semi-finals by eliminating Pablo Arraya, Jonas Svensson, Carl-Uwe Steeb, Jim Courier and the defending champion Mats Wilander in straight sets in the quarterfinals.  He was eliminated by the eventual champion Michael Chang in four sets.

The most famous match in Chesnokov's career took place on 24 September 1995 in the semi-final of the 1995 Davis Cup against Germany. In the fifth set of the final deciding match of the semi-final, playing against Michael Stich, Chesnokov saved nine match points before emerging the winner, the final score being: 6–4, 1–6, 1–6, 6–3, 14–12. The next day President of Russia Boris Yeltsin awarded Chesnokov with Order of Courage.

During his career, Chesnokov won seven top-level singles titles and earned prize-money totalling US$3,084,188. He retired from the professional tour in 1999, even if the last full year on tour was 1995 and from 1996 on he played only a few tournaments.

On 20 November 2005, during a visit to Dnipropetrovsk (Ukraine), he was shot twice with rubber bullets after a quarrel in a restaurant with two unidentified men.

As a sixteen-year-old Chesnokov was one of those present at the UEFA Cup match between FC Spartak Moscow and HFC Haarlem during which the Luzhniki disaster happened. He was an honorary member of the committee that organized a benefit match for the victims between Spartak Moscow and Haarlem, that took place on October 20, 2007.

Chesnokov is currently coaching Elena Vesnina.

In 2013, Chesnokov, whose mother was Jewish, who carried the last name Litvinova, celebrated his bar mitzvah in France.

Legacy
Chesnokov has always been outspoken about the Soviet system as a crucial reason for his less triumphant career. In February 2021, considering the fact of a higher level of availability of tennis to the general audience of citizens in the USSR, if compared to modern Russia, he stated: "Formally it was more available. But we had nothing. No balls, no racquets, no tennis shoes. You could count indoor courts on one hand. As a teenager, I could train on the court only 3 hours a week, and in winter I played mostly hockey. I think, if I was not born in the USSR I would have achieved more in tennis." In September 2021, he continued by declaring there was absolutely nothing good in the Soviet rule.

Career finals

Singles (7 titles, 8 runners-up)

Performance timelines

Singles

1986 Goodwill Games singles matches

References

External links 
 
 
 

1966 births
Hopman Cup competitors
Living people
Jewish tennis players
Olympic tennis players of the Soviet Union
Olympic tennis players of the Unified Team
Russian male tennis players
Russian Jews
Soviet male tennis players
Tennis players from Moscow
Tennis players at the 1988 Summer Olympics
Tennis players at the 1992 Summer Olympics
Recipients of the Order of Courage
Goodwill Games medalists in tennis
Competitors at the 1986 Goodwill Games
Russian tennis coaches
Friendship Games medalists in tennis